Dokaor Toongtong is a Thai luk thung and mor lam sing singer from the Isan area. Her most popular songs include Ber Tho Jao Choo, Oak Hak Wan Hae Tiean, Miea Kao and Rak Phay Thee Kaeng Saphue.

She is also sometimes known by her nickname Aor or the epithet Sao Sieng Sor (สาวเสียงซอ).

Early life
She was born on 23 September 1977 in Ubon Ratchathani Province to Samran and Sanga Boonmee, and was named Buppha Boonmee by birth.

Music career 
Toongtong has a contract with the GMM Grammy record label and debuted in 2003 with her first studio album, Oak Hak Wan Hae Tiean (อกหักวันแห่เทียน). Her second album, Ber Tho Jao Choo (เบอร์โทรเจ้าชู้), was written by Sala Khunnawut and released in 2006.

In 2018, she recorded a single named Rak Phai Thee Kaeng Saphue (รักพ่ายที่แก่งสะพือ), which was written by Dao Bandon.

Personal life
She has a younger sister named Kantong Thoongnugen, who is also a mor lam sing singer.

References

External links
 

1977 births
Living people
Dokaor Toongtong
Dokaor Toongtong
Dokaor Toongtong
Dokaor Toongtong
Dokaor Toongtong